This article details Trailer Nos. 45–48 of the Manx Electric Railway on the Isle of Man.

Supplied by G.F. Milnes & Co., in 1899 each seating 44 passengers, these trailers all remain today with the exception of 45 which lost its body during the winter of 2003 and was converted into a flat wagon in a way that summed up the management's attitude to their historic tramcar fleet. The bodywork has however been retained for future use.

References

Sources
 Manx Manx Electric Railway Fleetlist (2002) Manx Electric Railway Society
 Island Island Images: Manx Electric Railway Pages (2003) Jon Wornham
 Official Official Tourist Department Page (2009) Isle Of Man Heritage Railways

Manx Electric Railway